Vipera berus, also known as the common European adder and the common European viper, is a species of venomous snake in the family Viperidae. The species is extremely widespread and can be found throughout most of Central Europe and Eastern Europe, and as far as East Asia. There are three recognised subspecies.

Known by a host of common names including common adder and common viper, the adder has been the subject of much folklore in Britain and other European countries. It is not regarded as especially dangerous; the snake is not aggressive and usually bites only when really provoked, stepped on, or picked up. Bites can be very painful, but are seldom fatal. The specific name, berus, is New Latin and was at one time used to refer to a snake, possibly the grass snake, Natrix natrix.

The common adder is found in different terrains, habitat complexity being essential for different aspects of its behaviour. It feeds on small mammals, birds, lizards, and amphibians, and in some cases on spiders, worms, and insects. The common adder, like most other vipers, is ovoviviparous. Females breed once every two or three years, with litters usually being born in late summer to early autumn in the Northern Hemisphere. Litters range in size from three to 20 with young staying with their mothers for a few days. Three subspecies are recognized, including the nominate subspecies, Vipera berus berus described here. The snake is not considered to be threatened, though it is protected in some countries.

Taxonomy
There are three subspecies of V. berus that are recognised as being valid including the nominotypical subspecies.

The subspecies V. b. bosniensis and V. b. sachalinensis have been regarded as full species in some recent publications.

The name 'adder' is derived from nædre, an Old English word that had the generic meaning of serpent in the older forms of many Germanic languages. It was commonly used in the Old English version of the Christian Scriptures for the devil and the serpent in the Book of Genesis. In the 14th century, 'a nadder' in Middle English was rebracketed to 'an adder' (just as 'a napron' became 'an apron' and 'a nompere changed into 'an umpire').

In keeping with its wide distribution and familiarity through the ages, Vipera berus has a large number of common names in English, which include:
Common European adder, common European viper, European viper, northern viper, adder, common adder, crossed viper, European adder, common viper, European common viper, cross adder, or common cross adder.

In Denmark, Norway and Sweden, the snake is known as hugorm, hoggorm and huggorm, roughly translated as 'striking snake'. In Finland, it is known as kyykäärme or simply kyy, in Estonia it is known as rästik, while in Lithuania it is known as angis. In Poland the snake is called żmija zygzakowata, which translates as 'zigzag viper', due to the pattern on its back.

Description
Maximum size varies by region.

The head is fairly large and distinct and its sides are almost flat and vertical. The edge of the snout is usually raised into a low ridge. Seen from above, the rostral scale is not visible, or only just. Immediately behind the rostral, there are two (rarely one) small scales.

Dorsally, there are usually five large plates: a squarish frontal (longer than wide, sometimes rectangular), two parietals (sometimes with a tiny scale between the frontal and the parietals), and two long and narrow supraoculars. The latter are large and distinct, each separated from the frontal by one to four small scales. The nostril is situated in a shallow depression within a large nasal scale.

The eye is relatively large—equal in size or slightly larger than the nasal scale—but often smaller in females. Below the supraoculars are six to 13 (usually eight to 10) small circumorbital scales. The temporal scales are smooth (rarely weakly keeled). There are 10–12 sublabials and six to 10 (usually eight or 9) supralabials. Of the latter, the numbers 3 and 4 are the largest, while 4 and 5 (rarely 3 and 4) are separated from the eye by a single row of small scales (sometimes two rows in alpine specimens).

Midbody there are 21 dorsal scales rows (rarely 19, 20, 22, or 23). These are strongly keeled scales, except for those bordering the ventral scales. These scales seem loosely attached to the skin and lower rows become increasingly wide; those closest to the ventral scales are twice as wide as the ones along the midline. The ventral scales number 132–150 in males and 132–158 in females. The anal plate is single. The subcaudals are paired, numbering 32–46 in males and 23–38 in females.

The colour pattern varies, ranging from very light-coloured specimens with small, incomplete, dark dorsal crossbars to entirely brown ones with faint or clear, darker brown markings, and on to melanistic individuals that are entirely dark and lack any apparent dorsal pattern. However, most have some kind of zigzag dorsal pattern down the entire length of their bodies and tails. The head usually has a distinctive dark V or X on the back. A dark streak runs from the eye to the neck and continues as a longitudinal series of spots along the flanks.

Unusually for snakes, it is often possible to distinguish the sexes by their colour. Females are usually brownish in hue with dark-brown markings, the males are pure grey with black markings. The basal colour of males will often be slightly lighter than that of the females, making the black zigzag pattern stand out. The melanistic individuals are often females.

Distribution and habitat

Vipera berus has a wide range. It can be found across the Eurasian land-mass; from northwestern Europe (Great Britain, Belgium, Netherlands, Scandinavia, Germany, France) across southern Europe (Italy, Serbia, Albania, Croatia, Montenegro, Bosnia and Herzegovina, North Macedonia, Bulgaria, and northern Greece) and eastern Europe to north of the Arctic Circle, and Russia to the Pacific Ocean, Sakhalin Island, North Korea, northern Mongolia and northern China. It is found farther north than any other snake species. The type locality was originally listed as 'Europa'. Mertens and Müller (1940) proposed restricting the type locality to Uppsala, Sweden and it was eventually restricted to Berthåga, Uppsala by designation of a neotype by Krecsák & Wahlgren (2008).

In several European countries, it is notable as being the only native venomous snake. It is one of only three snake species native to Britain. The other two, the barred grass snake and the smooth snake, are non-venomous.

Sufficient habitat complexity is a crucial requirement for the presence of this species, in order to support its various behaviours—basking, foraging, and hibernation—as well as to offer some protection from predators and human harassment. It is found in a variety of habitats, including: chalky downs, rocky hillsides, moors, sandy heaths, meadows, rough commons, edges of woods, sunny glades and clearings, bushy slopes and hedgerows, dumps, coastal dunes, and stone quarries. It will venture into wetlands if dry ground is available nearby and thus may be found on the banks of streams, lakes, and ponds.

In much of southern Europe, such as southern France and northern Italy, it is found in either low lying wetlands or at high altitudes. In Hungary and Russia, it avoids open steppeland; a habitat in which V. ursinii is more likely to occur. In Russia, however, it does occur in the forest steppe zone.

Conservation status

In Great Britain, it is illegal to kill, injure, harm or sell adders under the Wildlife and Countryside Act 1981. The common viper is categorised as 'endangered' in Switzerland, and is also protected in some other countries in its range. It is also found in many protected areas.

This species is listed as protected (Appendix III) under the Berne Convention. Despite the convention, it is not protected in Finland because of a reservation.

The International Union for Conservation of Nature Red List of Threatened Species describes the conservation status as of 'least concern' in view of its wide distribution, presumed large population, broad range of habitats, and likely slow rate of decline though it acknowledges the population to be decreasing. Reduction in habitat for a variety of reasons, fragmentation of populations in Europe due to intense agriculture practices, and collection for the pet trade or for venom extraction have been recorded as major contributing factors for its decline. A citizen science based survey in the UK found evidence of extensive population declines in the UK, especially affecting smaller populations. A combination of public pressure and disturbance, habitat fragmentation and poor habitat management were considered the most likely causes of the decline. The release of 47 million non-native pheasants and 10 million partridges each year by countryside estates has also been suggested to have a significant impact on adder populations across the UK, with the possibility the reptile could be extinct within 12 years.

Behaviour

This species is mainly diurnal, especially in the north of its range. Further south it is said to be active in the evening, and it may even be active at night during the summer months. It is predominantly a terrestrial species, although it has been known to climb up banks and into low bushes in order to bask or search for prey.

Adders are not usually aggressive, tending to be rather timid and biting only when cornered or alarmed. People are generally bitten only after stepping on them or attempting to pick them up. They will usually disappear into the undergrowth at a hint of any danger, but will return once all is quiet, often to the same spot. Occasionally, individual snakes will reveal their presence with a loud and sustained hissing, presumably to warn off potential aggressors. Often, these turn out to be pregnant females. When the adder is threatened, the front part of the body is drawn into an S-shape to prepare for a strike.

The species is cold-adapted and hibernates in the winter. In Great Britain, males and females hibernate for about 150 and 180 days, respectively. In northern Sweden hibernation lasts 8–9 months. On mild winter days, they may emerge to bask where the snow has melted and will often travel across snow. About 15% of adults and 30–40% of juveniles die during hibernation.

Feeding

Diet consists mainly of small mammals, such as mice, rats, voles, and shrews, as well as lizards. Sometimes, slow worms are taken, and even weasels and moles. Adders also feed on amphibians, such as frogs, newts, and salamanders. Birds are also reported to be consumed, especially nestlings and even eggs, for which they will climb into shrubbery and bushes. Generally, diet varies depending on locality. Juveniles will eat nestling mammals, small lizards and frogs as well as worms and spiders. One important dietary source for young adders is the alpine salamander (salamadra atra). Because both species live at higher altitudes, S. atra could be a prevalent food source for adders, since there may be fewer other animals. One study suggests that alpine salamanders could consist of almost half of the adders' diets in some locations. They have been witnessed swallowing these salamanders in the early morning hours

Reproduction
In Hungary, mating takes place in the last week of April, whilst in the north it happens later (in the second week of May). Mating has also been observed in June and even early October, but it is not known if this autumn mating results in any offspring. Females often breed once every two years, or even once every three years if the seasons are short and the climate is not conducive.

Males find females by following their scent trails, sometimes tracking them for hundreds of metres a day. If a female is found and then flees, the male follows. Courtship involves side-by-side parallel 'flowing' behaviour, tongue flicking along the back and excited lashing of the tail. Pairs stay together for one or two days after mating. Males chase away their rivals and engage in combat. Often, this also starts with the aforementioned flowing behaviour before culminating in the dramatic 'adder dance'. In this act, the males confront each other, raise up the front part of the body vertically, make swaying movements and attempt to push each other to the ground. This is repeated until one of the two becomes exhausted and crawls off to find another mate. Appleby (1971) notes that he has never seen an intruder win one of these contests, as if the frustrated defender is so aroused by courtship that he refuses to lose his chance to mate. There is no record of any biting taking place during these bouts.

Females usually give birth in August or September, but sometimes as early as July, or as late as early October. Litters range in size from 3 to 20. The young are usually born encased in a transparent sac from which they must free themselves. Sometimes, they succeed in freeing themselves from this membrane while still inside the female.

They are born with a fully functional venom apparatus and a reserve supply of yolk within their bodies. They shed their skins for the first time within a day or two. Females do not appear to take much interest in their offspring, but the young have been observed to remain near their mothers for several days after birth.

Venom
Because of the rapid rate of human expansion throughout the range of this species, bites are relatively common. Domestic animals and livestock are frequent victims. In Great Britain, most instances occur in March–October. In Sweden, there are about 1,300 bites a year, with an estimated 12% that require hospitalisation. At least eight different antivenoms are available against bites from this species.

Mallow et al. (2003) describe the venom toxicity as being relatively low compared to other viper species. They cite Minton (1974) who reported the  values for mice to be 0.55 mg/kg IV, 0.80 mg/kg IP and 6.45 mg/kg SC. As a comparison, in one test the minimum lethal dose of venom for a guinea pig was 40–67 mg, but only 1.7 mg was necessary when Daboia russelii venom was used. Brown (1973) gives a higher subcutaneous LD50 range of 1.0–4.0 mg/kg. All agree that the venom yield is low: Minton (1974) mentions 10–18 mg for specimens  in length, while Brown (1973) lists only 6 mg.
Relatively speaking, bites from this species are not highly dangerous. In Britain there were only 14 known fatalities between 1876 and 2005—the last a 5-year-old child in 1975—and one nearly fatal bite of a 39-year-old woman in Essex in 1998. An 82-year-old woman died following a bite in Germany in 2004, although it is not clear whether her death was due to the effect of the venom. A 44-year-old British man was left seriously ill after he was bitten by an adder in the Dalby Forest, Yorkshire, in 2014. Even so, professional medical help should always be sought as soon as possible after any bite. Very occasionally bites can be life-threatening, particularly in small children, while adults may experience discomfort and disability long after the bite. The length of recovery varies, but may take up to a year. Surprisingly, Norway has on average registered one death from the snake every 10 years, despite only having 200-500 reports of bites a year.

Local symptoms include immediate and intense pain, followed after a few minutes (but perhaps by as much as 30 minutes) by swelling and a tingling sensation. Blisters containing blood are not common. The pain may spread within a few hours, along with tenderness and inflammation. Reddish lymphangitic lines and bruising may appear, and the whole limb can become swollen and bruised within 24 hours. Swelling may also spread to the trunk, and with children, throughout the entire body. Necrosis and intracompartmental syndromes are very rare.

Systemic symptoms resulting from anaphylaxis can be dramatic. These may appear within 5 minutes post bite, or can be delayed for many hours. Such symptoms include nausea, retching and vomiting, abdominal colic and diarrhoea, incontinence of urine and faeces, sweating, fever, vasoconstriction, tachycardia, lightheadedness, loss of consciousness, blindness, shock, angioedema of the face, lips, gums, tongue, throat and epiglottis, urticaria and bronchospasm. If left untreated, these symptoms may persist or fluctuate for up to 48 hours. In severe cases, cardiovascular failure may occur.

Folklore
Adders were believed to be deaf, which is mentioned in Psalm 58 (v. 4), but snake oil made from them was used as a cure for deafness and earache. Females were thought to swallow their young when threatened and regurgitate them unharmed later. It was believed that they did not die until sunset. Remedies for adder "stings" included killing the snake responsible and rubbing the corpse or its fat on the wound, also holding a pigeon or chicken on the bite, or jumping over water. Adders were thought to be attracted to hazel trees and repelled by ash trees.

Druids believed that large frenzied gatherings of adders occurred in spring, at the centre of which could be found a polished rock called an adder stone or Glain Neidr in the Welsh language. These stones were said to have held supernatural powers.

References

Further reading

Ananjeva NB, Borkin LJ, Darevsky IS, Orlov NL (1998). [Amphibians and Reptiles. Encyclopedia of Nature of Russia]. Moscow: ABF. (in Russian).
Arnold EN, Burton JA (1978). A Field Guide to the Reptiles and Amphibians of Britain and Europe. London: Collins. 272 pp. . (Vipera berus, pp. 217–218 + Plate 39 + Map 122).
Boulenger GA (1896). Catalogue of the Snakes in the British Museum (Natural History). Volume III., Containing the...Viperidæ. London: Trustees of the British Museum (Natural History). (Taylor and Francis, printers). xiv + 727 pp. + Plates I.- XXV. (Vipera berus, pp. 476–481).
Goin CJ, Goin OB, Zug GR (1978). Introduction to Herpetology: Third Edition. San Francisco: W.H. Freeman. xi + 378 pp. . (Vipera berus, pp. 122, 188, 334).
Jan G, Sordelli F (1874). Iconographie générale des Ophidiens: Quarante-cinquième Livraison. Paris: Baillière. Index + Plates I.- VI. (Vipera berus, Plate II, Figure 1; var. prester, Plate II, Figures 2-4; var. concolor, Plate II, Figure 5; var. lymnaea, Plate II, Figure 6).
Joger U, Lenk P, Baran I, Böhme W, Ziegler T, Heidrich P, Wink M (1997). "The phylogenetic position of Vipera barani and of Vipera nikolskii within the Vipera berus complex". Herpetologica Bonnensis 185-194.
Linnaeus C (1758). Systema naturæ per regna tria naturæ, secundum classes, ordines, genera, species, cum characteribus, differentiis, synonymis, locis. Tomus I. Editio Decima, Reformata. Stockholm: L. Salvius. 824 pp. (Coluber berus, p. 217).
Minton SA Jr. (1974). Venom Diseases. Springfield, Illinois: CC Thomas Publ. 256 pp. .
Morris PA (1948). Boy's Book of Snakes: How to Recognize and Understand Them. A volume of the Humanizing Science Series, edited by Jacques Cattell. New York: Ronald Press. viii + 185 pp. (The common viper, Vipera berus, pp. 154–155, 182).
Wüster W, Allum CSE, Bjargardóttir IB, Bailey KL, Dawson KJ, Guenioui J, Lewis J, McGurk J, Moore AG, Niskanen M, Pollard CP. (2004). "Do aposematism and Batesian mimicry require bright colours? A test, using European viper markings". Proceedings of the Royal Society of London B 271: 2495–2499. PDF at Wolfgang Wüster, School of Biological Sciences, University of Wales, Bangor. Accessed 15 August 2006.

External links

berus
Reptiles of Europe
Reptiles of East Asia
Reptiles of Russia
Fauna of Siberia
Arctic land animals
Aposematic species
Reptiles described in 1758
Taxa named by Carl Linnaeus
Taxobox binomials not recognized by IUCN